New Virginia is a city in Warren County, Iowa, United States. The population was 498 at the time of the 2020 census. It is part of the Des Moines–West Des Moines Metropolitan Statistical Area.

History
New Virginia was laid out in 1856.

Geography
New Virginia is located at  (41.182650, -93.729560).

Demographics

2010 census
As of the census of 2010, there were 489 people, 196 households, and 134 families living in the city. The racial makeup of the city was 99.4% White, 0.2% African American, 0.2% Native American, and 0.2% from two or more races. Hispanic or Latino of any race were 0.8% of the population.

There were 196 households, of which 35.7% had children under the age of 18 living with them, 53.1% were married couples living together, 9.2% had a female householder with no husband present, 6.1% had a male householder with no wife present, and 31.6% were non-families. 27.6% of all households were made up of individuals, and 13.3% had someone living alone who was 65 years of age or older. The average household size was 2.49 and the average family size was 3.04.

The median age in the city was 33.3 years. 28.6% of residents were under the age of 18; 6.8% were between the ages of 18 and 24; 28.5% were from 25 to 44; 21.2% were from 45 to 64; and 14.9% were 65 years of age or older. The gender makeup of the city was 51.3% male and 48.7% female.

2000 census
As of the census of 2000, there were 469 people, 192 households, and 137 families living in the city. The racial makeup of the city was 98.08% White, 0.21% Pacific Islander, and 1.71% from two or more races. Hispanic or Latino of any race were 0.21% of the population.

There were 192 households, out of which 31.8% had children under the age of 18 living with them, 60.4% were married couples living together, 5.2% had a female householder with no husband present, and 28.6% were non-families. 23.4% of all households were made up of individuals, and 14.1% had someone living alone who was 65 years of age or older. The average household size was 2.44 and the average family size was 2.89.

In the city, the population was spread out, with 23.5% under the age of 18, 8.1% from 18 to 24, 29.4% from 25 to 44, 25.2% from 45 to 64, and 13.9% who were 65 years of age or older. The median age was 37 years. For every 100 females, there were 106.6 males. For every 100 females age 18 and over, there were 102.8 males.

The median income for a household in the city was $38,750, and the median income for a family was $47,500. Males had a median income of $36,042 versus $26,625 for females. The per capita income for the city was $20,803. About 8.1% of families and 9.9% of the population were below the poverty line, including 13.6% of those under age 18 and 8.0% of those age 65 or over.

Education
Interstate 35 Community School District serves the municipality.

References

Cities in Iowa
Cities in Warren County, Iowa
Des Moines metropolitan area
1856 establishments in Iowa